Ševko Omerbašić (born 9 June 1945) is a Croatian imam and former president of the Islamic Community in Croatia and Slovenia.

Biography 

Omerbašić was born in Ustikolina, near Foča, Yugoslavia, presently in Bosnia and Herzegovina. He finished elementary school in his birthplace and went to Sarajevo where he entered high school, the Gazi Husrev-beg Madrasa which he attended from 1956 until 1964. After he finished high school education, he worked as an imam in Rudo, and then he returned to Ustikolina also as imam.  

Soon after he enlisted into the Yugoslav Army, and after that he went to be educated in Libya at the Islamic University of Libya where he studied Islam and Arabic. He returned to Yugoslavia in 1975 and was appointed as imam of Zagreb. In 1988 he became chief mufti of the Islamic Communities in Croatia and Slovenia. In 1990 when the Seniority of the Islamic Community of Croatia and Slovenia was founded, Omerbašić was named its president and thus he got the title "mufti".

He taught for five years at the Jesuit Faculty of Philosophy of Society at the University of Zagreb; for ten years he taught the history of Islam, interpretation of the Qur'an, Arabic language and Islamic studies at Zagreb's Dr. Ahmed Smajlović Madrasa. Omerbašić attended two years of religious pedagogy at Catechetical Institute of the Catholic Theological Faculty in Zagreb.

In the 2017 Zagreb local elections Omberbašić was elected member of the Zagreb City Assembly as a candidate of Milan Bandić's party list.

Views 

Omerbašić is known for inter-religious tolerance. As he was teaching, he introduced the practice of sending his students to Catholic mass. He is also an opponent of terrorism committed by Islamic extremists, explaining that such things occur because of misreading the Qur'an.

References 

1945 births
Living people
People from Foča
Bosniaks of Bosnia and Herzegovina
Bosnia and Herzegovina Sunni Muslims
Gazi Husrev Bey's Madrasa alumni
University of Zagreb alumni
University of Libya alumni
Bosnia and Herzegovina imams
Croatian imams
20th-century imams
21st-century imams